Doludizgin is a village in the Tunceli District, Tunceli Province, Turkey. The village is populated by Kurds of non-tribal affiliation and had a population of 31 in 2021.

The hamlet of Uzunkavak is attached to the village.

References 

Villages in Tunceli District
Kurdish settlements in Tunceli Province